Answer That and Stay Fashionable is the debut studio album by American punk rock band AFI. It was originally released on July 4, 1995, through Wingnut Records and rereleased on April 22, 1997, through Nitro Records.

Background
Answer That and Stay Fashionable was recorded in Hayward, California, at Art of Ears, the studio of Andy Ernst, in 1995. The album was produced by AFI, along with Doug Sangalang, Tim Armstrong and Brett Reed. It was recorded in under a week.

All of the tracks except "Open Your Eyes" are copyrighted to Anthems for Insubordinates.

The album originally included a hidden track, a cover of The Police's "Man in a Suitcase", which is absent on the rerelease. In its place is a cover of The Circus Tents' "Open Your Eyes", originally released with an alternate mix on the Fly in the Ointment EP in 1995.

Many audio samples are included throughout the album, such as a clip from Reservoir Dogs (1992), whose theatrical release poster the cover artwork parodies. Also featured is a clip from The Comic Strip episode "Bad News Tour", from which the album derives its name, and National Lampoon's European Vacation (1985).

The tracks "Two of a Kind" and "Yürf Rendenmein" were later re-recorded for AFI's second album Very Proud of Ya.

Track listing

Personnel
Credits adapted from liner notes.

 AFI – producer
 Tim Armstrong – co-producer 
 Adam Carson – drums, percussion
 Andy Ernst – engineer, recording
 Davey Havok –– lead vocals
 George Horn – mastering
 Geoff Kresge – bass, vocals
 Brett Reed – co-producer 
 Doug Sangalang – co-producer
 Markus Stopholese – guitars
 Steve Z – photography

Studios
 Recorded at Art of Ears, Hayward, CA
 Mastered  at Fantasy Studios, Berkeley, CA

References

AFI (band) albums
1995 debut albums